Seagull Trust Cruises (formerly Seagull Trust) is a waterway society and Scottish charity.

The Trust was formed in 1978 and offers free canal cruising for disabled and disadvantaged persons and groups. The Seagull Trust was awarded the Queen's Award for Voluntary Service in 2007.

It provides a service from four locations in Scotland. These are Ratho (Edinburgh) on the Union Canal, Falkirk also on the Union Canal, Inverness on the Caledonian Canal, and at Kirkintilloch on the Forth and Clyde Canal.

From these locations, it operates eight canal boats, adapted with a lift for wheelchair access, and fitted with a galley and toilet. Seven operate daily excursions; one (the Marion Seagull) is adapted as a residential boat for hire to families with a disabled member. The Wooden Spoon Seagull is fitted out as a floating classroom.

History
The Seagull Trust was formed on 21 November 1978 by the Reverend P. Hugh Mackay. He was Minister of the Parish of Torphichen (1927-1960) where he ran Sea Scouts on the Union Canal, and then Minister of Prenmay and Leslie in Gordon to 1972. He retired to North Berwick, and died in 1994. It was during his retirement that he was involved in the formation of the Seagull Trust. At Torphichen in 1947 Mackay resurrected the Ancient Order of St John. He had learned about two other canal projects, one in England, run by Claire Hanmer, who converted a narrow boat for the service of disabled people on the Midland canals, and a project in Wales, the Sunshine Boat, run under the auspices of The Prince's Trust.

From the project in Wales, Charles Quant suggested to the Inland Waterways Amenity Advisory Council (IWAAC) that this operation demonstrated that sections of the canal system regarded as "remainder" canals were being used to good effect and as such the organisation could fulfil a dual role of providing a service to disabled people and demonstrate the advantages of canal travel to the wider public.

As British Waterways at the time had no obligation to maintain remainder canals in navigable condition, this renewed use of the 'remainder' canal system became the early part of a movement which supported the continued existence of the canals.

R.J. Hume, a friend of Mackay and a member of IWAAC, brought these two projects to the attention of Mackay, and between them they planned to set up a similar service on the Scottish canals.

Simon Campbell, manager at the time of the Lady Haig's Poppy Factory in Edinburgh, had joined the original steering group, and it was he who suggested the name 'Seagull Trust' referring to the apparently effortless flight of these birds, an analogy to the freedom which canal boating can give.

Ratho

Rev Mackay approached the Order of St John for £10,000 to buy a boat and meet its immediate running costs. The boat purchased was Claire Hanmer's original craft, which was renamed the St John Crusader. The naming ceremony took place in 1979 at Wester Hailes and was attended by the Duke of Hamilton.

Mackay was anxious that the Trust should have its own accommodation and acquired a partially built canalside facility at Wester Hailes (which was in fact never developed by the Trust). This was beneficial for the canal as its presence prevented the blocking off of the waterway at the building of the new Edinburgh City Bypass. An aqueduct crossing was provided instead of keeping the waterway open.

The St John Crusader was joined by the Janet Telford. The Janet Telford was found to be too small for use by the Trust and was sold to the Forth and Clyde Canal Society. She was replaced by the Mackay Seagull, which is still in operation today. The St John Crusader is not in use today and has been replaced by the St John Crusader II, which came into service in 1996. The St John Crusader is now named Bluebell and is still occasionally seen at Ratho. A third barge, St John Edinburgh was added to the Ratho fleet in 2011.

Cruises operate from Ratho 7 days a week from Easter to the end of October. Typically, 6000 individual passengers are carried each year.

Kirkintilloch

The trustees looked to Kirkintilloch as the location for a second branch. After discussions with British Waterways, a boathouse was built near the town centre, on the site of R. Hay and Sons Boatyard. This building also housed a dry dock to provide housing and facilities for repair and maintenance for two boats.

The construction was completed in 1984, in time for the arrival of the Yarrow Seagull. This boat was built at Yarrow Shipbuilders by the then apprentices. She was taken back to Yarrow's yard on the Clyde in Spring 2009 for a complete refit.

The second boat to arrive at Kirkintilloch was the Marjorie Seagull in 2001. This boat was built by a bequest in honour of Marjorie Brown from Edinburgh. It was built by Stenson Marine in Derby to a new design which aimed to lift passengers higher from the water level in order to see better over the higher banks on the Forth and Clyde Canal.

Town centre development saw the need for the land which the building sat on. New accommodation was built further along the canal adjacent to the new marina and was opened by the Princess Royal on 30 September 2008.

Falkirk

The Falkirk branch was formed in 1982, with the original idea being to cruise on the westernmost end of the Union Canal. Money was raised for a new boat, The Govan Seagull, which entered service at the branch in 1985. Cruising originally was on the Forth and Clyde Canal between Camelon and Bonnybridge, while British Waterways prepared the Union Canal for use. The Govan Seagull was transferred up to the Union Canal in 1987 and moored at Greenbank. Vandalism was a problem, and money was raised to build accommodation, which was completed in 1992, at Bantaskine. The new accommodation was to provide enclosed mooring for one boat and a fully equipped reception centre for the passengers. A lift was fitted which allowed embarkation within the building. It also housed a meeting room which provided for meetings of the Falkirk members.

The Barr Seagull joined the fleet at Falkirk in 2006. She was bought by the Barr Charitable Trust for operation in Falkirk. The steel work was carried out in Falkirk by A.L. Gordon Ltd.

The Marion Seagull was built by funding from the Salvesen Charitable Trust, named in memory of Marion H Salvesen. It was designed and built as a residential boat, for use by families with a disabled member.

Inverness

The Highland branch was formed in 1987, operating on the Caledonian Canal. The Highland Seagull was built in 1975, formerly a cruiser on the Caledonian Canal and Loch Ness, the Abbey Princess. It was completely adapted by Caley Marina, Inverness, for operation with the Trust. It was renamed in 1989 by the Duke and Duchess of York.

A replacement boat, the Highland Cross Seagull, was built in 2011/2012 with the original Highland Seagull being transported south to the Lowland Canals to be lengthened, adapted and used as a floating classroom. The Highland Seagull is now named the Wooden Spoon Seagull.

Fleet

See also
List of waterway societies in the United Kingdom
Other boating charities giving access to disabled people:
Accessible Boating Association
Nancy Oldfield Trust
Peter Le Marchant Trust

References

External links
BBC Radio Four, Open Country,programme 26 April 2003; Cruise on the Govan Seagull
West Lothian Council report on Seagull Trust cruise
Patient.info website listing of Seagull Trust
Geograph photo of Seagull Trust's base at Kirkintilloch
Seagull Trusts's website

Clubs and societies in Scotland
Charities based in Scotland
Kirkintilloch
1978 establishments in Scotland
Organizations established in 1978
Waterways organisations in Scotland
Disabled boating